Mechelina Agnes Elisabeth "Lies" Aengenendt (10 July 1907 – 17 December 1988) was a Dutch sprinter. She competed in the women's 100 metres at the 1928 Summer Olympics.

References

External links
 

1907 births
1988 deaths
Athletes (track and field) at the 1928 Summer Olympics
Dutch female sprinters
Olympic athletes of the Netherlands
Sportspeople from Nijmegen
Olympic female sprinters
20th-century Dutch women
20th-century Dutch people